Posyolok sanatoriya imeni Abelmana is a rural locality (a settlement) in Klyazminskoye Rural Settlement, Kovrovsky District, Vladimir Oblast, Russia. The population was 262 as of 2010.

Geography 
The settlement is located 8 km northeast of Kovrov (the district's administrative centre) by road. Ashcherino is the nearest rural locality.

References 

Rural localities in Kovrovsky District